Antipodia dactyliota is a species of butterfly of the family Hesperiidae. It is found in Western Australia.

The wingspan is about 30 mm.

The larvae feed on Gahnia lanigera.

Subspecies
Antipodia dactyliota anaces
Antipodia dactyliota anapus
Antipodia dactyliota nila

External links
 Australian Caterpillars

Trapezitinae
Butterflies described in 1888
Butterflies of Australia
Taxa named by Edward Meyrick